"Box the Fox" (sometimes just "Box Fox") is a tune of Appalachian origin, usually played on the fiddle or banjo.  The song is played in 6-6 time.  The name comes from the old Irish slang "to box the fox", meaning to steal apples or, in general, to rob an orchard.

References

External links
Musical notation for "Box the Fox"

Appalachian folk songs
Year of song unknown
Songwriter unknown